Cumnock is a small town in New South Wales, Australia. It is located on the now closed cross-country railway line from Molong to Dubbo. The town is located in Cabonne Shire. In the 2021 census the "Suburbs and Localities" of Cumnock had a population of 491.

Cumnock is named after the Scottish town in Ayrshire, the home of an early settler named Straborn.

The Cumnock community pioneered a farmhouse rental program designed to attract new families to the area by making farmhouses available for rent for $1. This program has since spread to a number of other rural communities.

Cumnock is located at the epicentre of the Central Western NSW's food-and-wine triangle, i.e., Orange, Dubbo, and Mudgee.

The town is also known for its participation in the 120-kilometre Animals on Bikes 'Paddock Art' sculpture tourist trail which extends between Molong and the Dubbo Zoo, via Cumnock and Yeoval.

Notable residents
 Chris McKivat, Olympian and dual rugby code international.
 Tim Gavin, Australian Rugby International.
 Susan Cullen-Ward, later married to Leka, Crown Prince of Albania.
 Cecily Johnson, 2016 Bowls NSW Volunteer of the Year recipient.

References

External links
 Wellington-NSW:Cumnock

Towns in New South Wales
Cabonne Council